Dormeshia Sumbry-Edwards (born January 16, 1976 in Englewood, California) is an American tap dancer, choreographer, and instructor who has been called "the mastress of her generation." In 1998, she married fellow dancer Omar Edwards and opened a studio with him in Harlem; they have three children.

Early life and education 
Sumbry-Edwards began tap dancing at the age of 3 under the instruction of Paul and Arlene Kennedy at Universal Dance Theatre. At 8, she performed at the Tip Tap Festival in Rome. At 12, she made her Broadway debut in Black and Blue, alongside Gregory Hines, Jimmy Slyde, Buster Brown and Savion Glover. In 1989, the New York Times described her as part of a young generation who "have the certain something." After graduating from high school, Sumbry-Edwards joined Lynn Dally's Jazz Tap Ensemble as a soloist.

Career 
Sumbry-Edwards also appeared on Broadway in the Tony Award-winning Bring In Da’Noise, Bring In Da’Funk as the only female tap dancer, initially appearing dressed as a man. She has toured extensively in the United States and abroad.

As an instructor, Sumbry-Edwards has taught on the International Tap Festival circuit including the New York City Tap Festival, the Los Angeles Tap Festival, the Campinas Tap Festival, for K-Broadway in Tokyo, and at the Broadway Dance Center in New York City. She is currently on faculty in the dance department at Barnard College.

After her experience hearing responses to her role in Bring In Da’Noise, Bring In Da’Funk alongside male dancers, Sumbry-Edwards decided to think about new ways of teaching techniques of rhythm-tap for women, culminating in a Harlem Tap Studio course for Women in Heels described as "countering the downward-driving, piston-driven attack of traditional (male) rhythm-tapping styles with steps that were structured along more circuitous paths of attack."

Sumbry-Edwards was also a featured performer in Broadway's After Midnight for which she also won an Astaire Award for Best Performance.

Awards 
Sumbry-Edwards won a Bessie in 2012 for Outstanding Performer in Jason Samuels Smith's work "Chasing The Bird" performed at The Joyce Theater. She also was the recipient of a dance fellowship in 1994 as well as the prestigious Princess Grace Statue Award in 2017.

Film and Music Video Work 
 Tap with Gregory Hines
 Bamboozled, as "Pickaninny Topsy" and Assistant Choreographer
 The Rodgers and Hart Story: Thou Swell, Thou Witty
 Michael Jackson's music video “Rock Your World”

References 

1976 births
Living people
African-American actresses
African-American choreographers
African-American educators
African-American female dancers
American choreographers
American female dancers
American film actresses
American musical theatre actresses
American stage actresses
American tap dancers
American women choreographers
American women educators
Dance teachers
Educators from California
Educators from New York City
Musicians from Inglewood, California
Musicians from New York City
People from Harlem